MDSD could refer to:

Las Américas International Airport ICAO code
Model Driven Software Development, a software engineering term
 Most Different Systems Design/Mill's Method of Similarity in comparative politics
 Physician (MD) Self Disclosure